Jordon Cooke (born June 6, 1993) is a retired Canadian ice hockey goaltender. Cooke was selected by the Kelowna Rockets in the fourth round (79th overall) of the 2008 WHL Bantam Draft.

Cooke's outstanding season with the Kelowna Rockets during the 2013–14 WHL season was recognized when he was selected the WHL's Western Conference Goaltender of the Year and was named to the WHL's Western Conference First All-Star Team. In addition, on May 26, 2014, Cooke was also named CHL Goalie of the Year.

On July 3, 2014, it was announced that Cooke would be attending the LA Kings Development Camp held at the Toyota Sports Center beginning on July 7, 2014.

On December 20, 2014, Cooke was added to the 2016 Spengler Cup Team Canada roster, making him the first active player from Canada West Universities Athletic Association to be named to Canada’s Spengler Cup roster in over 30 years. Despite not playing in any games, Cooke won gold with the team as the third-string goalie, behind Zachary Fucale and Drew MacIntyre.

Awards and honours

References

External links 

1993 births
Living people
Canadian ice hockey goaltenders
Ice hockey people from Alberta
Kelowna Rockets players
People from Leduc, Alberta
Saskatchewan Huskies ice hockey players